Mitko Kabakov (born 22 October 1955) is a Bulgarian sailor. He competed in the Flying Dutchman event at the 1980 Summer Olympics.

References

External links
 

1955 births
Living people
Bulgarian male sailors (sport)
Olympic sailors of Bulgaria
Sailors at the 1980 Summer Olympics – Flying Dutchman
Place of birth missing (living people)